Alexsandr Dyachenko (born 17 October 1983) is a Kazakh former professional road bicycle racer, who rode professionally from 2004 to 2006 and 2008 to 2015, for the ,  and  teams.

In 2012, Dyachenko put in a solid performance at the Tour of Turkey, where he finished second overall, but the original winner Ivailo Gabrovski tested positive for erythropoietin (EPO). In October, it was announced that Gabrovski was stripped of the title, which went to Dyachenko.

On 10 June 2022, he was suspended for four years by the Court of Arbitration for Sport for doping.

Major results

2005
 9th Overall Tour of Greece
 10th Overall Tour of Japan
2006
 5th Overall Tour of Japan
 6th Overall Tour of Hainan
 8th Overall Tour of Greece
2007
 1st  Time trial, National Road Championships
 3rd Overall Tour of Japan
1st Mountains classification
 6th Overall Tour de l'Ain
 10th Overall Tour of Bulgaria
1st Stage 4
 10th Overall Tour of Hainan
2008
 2nd Trofeo Città di Castelfidardo
 6th Overall Okolo Slovenska
 6th GP Capodarco
 9th Ruota d'Oro
 10th Overall Tour of Hainan
2009
 7th Overall Volta a Catalunya
2011
 3rd Time trial, National Road Championships
 9th Time trial, UCI Road World Championships
 10th Overall Tour of Hainan
2012
 1st  Overall Tour of Turkey
1st Stage 3
 4th Overall Tour de Langkawi
 5th Overall Tour of Austria
2013
 National Road Championships
1st  Road race
2nd Time trial
 2nd Overall Tour of Austria
2014
 6th Overall Tour of Hainan

Grand Tour general classification results timeline

References

External links

Alexsandr Dyachenko's profile on Cycling Base

Kazakhstani male cyclists
1983 births
Living people
Presidential Cycling Tour of Turkey winners
Presidential Cycling Tour of Turkey stage winners
Cyclists at the 2002 Asian Games
Asian Games competitors for Kazakhstan
20th-century Kazakhstani people
21st-century Kazakhstani people